The Roxx Regime Demos is the eleventh release and third compilation album by Stryper consisting of songs originally released under the band's previous name, Roxx Regime, except for the track "Honestly", which is taken from a later demo. While the album's general release was on July 10, 2007, pre-sale purchases at Stryper.com shipped on July 7, 2007, a reference to 777, a number that used to appear onstage at Stryper concerts.

Critical reception

Greg Prato of Allmusic said, "you hear a band that had pretty much found their sound early on".  He compared the band favorably to other pop-metal bands of the time, but said the album was "aimed at die-hard die-hard Stryper fans".  Ken Pierce of Piercing Metal said the songs "rock quite well and are a fun listen", but also stated that  the release was for die-hard fans.

Track listing
All songs were written by Michael Sweet, except where noted.

"From Wrong to Right" (Oz Fox, Robert Sweet, M. Sweet) – 4:00
"My Love I'll Always Show" (original rock version) – 3:28
"Loud N Clear" – 3:42
"You Know What to Do" (Fox, M. Sweet, R. Sweet, Tim Gaines) – 5:04
"You Won’t Be Lonely" – 3:55
"Co’mon Rock" – 3:42
"Tank" (Sweet, R.) (drum solo) – 0:43
"Honestly" (original demo version) – 4:05

20th Anniversary (of Stryper.com) vinyl edition contains three bonus tracks. The bonus tracks are on side two between "Tank" and "Honestly".

"My Love I'll Always Show" (alternate demo)
"Loud N Clear" (alternate demo)
"You Won't Be Lonely" (alternate demo)

Personnel
Musicians
Robert Sweet – drums
Michael Sweet – vocals
Oz Fox – guitar, backing vocals
Tim Gaines – bass guitar
Jon Van Togren – keyboards

Production
Chaz (Charles) Ramirez – audio engineer
Jeff Carroll – audio mastering

References

External links
Stryper's Original Roxx Regime Demos to be Release on CD
Stryper – The Roxx Regime Demos

Stryper albums
Demo albums
2007 compilation albums
Heavy metal compilation albums
Glam metal compilation albums